Rio Pardo de Minas is a municipality in the northeast of the Brazilian state of Minas Gerais.

Location
It became a municipality in 1831. The postal code (CEP) is 39530-000. The population density was 9.33 inhabitants per km² (24.19 per mi²) in 2010. The Rio Pardo flows through the town. It is part of the statistical microregion of Salinas.

The municipality contains about 29% of the  Nascentes Geraizeiras Sustainable Development Reserve, created in 2014. The reserve protects an area of the cerrado biome.
The municipality also contains part of the  Serra Nova State Park, created in 2003.

Neighboring municipalities
Neighboring municipalities are:  Novorizonte, Fruta de Leite, Mato Verde, Porteirinha, Serranópolis de Minas, Riacho dos Machados, Grão Mogol, Padre Carvalho, Salinas,  Indaiabira, Vargem Grande do Rio Pardo, Montezuma and Santo Antônio do Retiro.

Economy
The main economic activities are cattle raising (10,000 head in 2006), small industries and agriculture.  The main crops are bananas, citrus fruits, beans, sugarcane, tomatoes, and corn.  In the rural area there were 3,205 producers on 75,000 ha.  Natural pasture made up 18,000 ha, woodland 33,000 ha. and planted area 11,500 ha.  Around 10,500 persons worked in agriculture.  The GDP in 2003 was R$64,482,000 while the per capita GDP was R$2,319.  In 2006 there was one bank.  Health needs were taken care of by 11 municipal health centers, one private health center and one hospital with 42 beds.

Health and education
This municipality is isolated from major population centers and suffers from drought and poor soils.
Municipal Human Development Index: .633 (2000)
State ranking: 787 out of 853 municipalities as of 2000
National ranking: 4,072 out of 5,138 municipalities as of 2000

See also
List of municipalities in Minas Gerais

References

Sources

Municipalities in Minas Gerais